Randy Moore is an American soil scientist and forester serving as the 20th chief of the United States Forest Service, a position he has held since July 2021. He was appointed by Secretary Tom Vilsack.

Education 
Moore earned a Bachelor of Science degree in plant and soil science from Southern University.

Career 
Moore began his career 1978 with the Natural Resources Conservation Service in North Dakota. He eventually joined the United States Forest Service in 1981. He has held various positions in the agency, including regional forester for the Eastern Region in Wisconsin and forest supervisor for Mark Twain National Forest in Missouri. Most recently, Moore served as the Pacific Southwestern regional forester, managing 18 national forests in California spanning 20 million acres, as well as state and private forestry programs in Hawaii and the Pacific Islands.

Moore has been an advocate for utilizing vegetation treatment methods to reduce the risk of wildfire, rather than relying solely on logging. He believes that this approach can effectively decrease wildfire risk while preserving the natural beauty and ecological integrity of the forest. In addition to his advocacy of vegetation treatment, Moore has also focused on improving the pay and working conditions for firefighters, as well as increasing capacity and resources through partnerships with other agencies and organizations.

See also 

 List of United States Forest Service Chiefs

References 

Living people
United States Forest Service officials
United States Department of Agriculture officials
Southern University alumni
Southern University at New Orleans alumni
American soil scientists
Soil scientists
Year of birth missing (living people)